Pulsano (Brindisino:  or ) is a town and comune in the province of Taranto in the Apulia region of southeast Italy.

References

Cities and towns in Apulia
Localities of Salento